Events from the year 1972 in Sweden

Incumbents
 Monarch – Gustaf VI Adolf 
 Prime Minister – Olof Palme

Events
30 September – The Öland Bridge between mainland Sweden and Swedish Baltic Sea island of Öland is inaugurated.
On November 28, Princess Sibylla, Duchess of Vasterbotten dies at age 64. She was the widow of Prince Gustaf Adolf, Duke of Vasterbotten (1906–1947), and mother of Crown Prince Carl Gustaf (future King of Sweden).

Births

 17 February – Lars-Göran Petrov, singer and drummer (Entombed and Morbid)
 29 April – Fredrik Kempe, songwriter and opera and pop singer
 20 May – Andreas Lundstedt, singer and actor (Alcazar)
 3 July – Henrik Fritzon, politician
 18 July – Fredrik Åkesson, guitarist
 3 August – Patrik Isaksson, singer and songwriter
 29 September – Jörgen Jönsson, ice hockey player.
 6 October – Anders Iwers, musician
 28 November – Jesper Strömblad, musician
 11 December – Daniel Alfredsson, ice hockey player.
 29 December – Andreas Dackell, ice hockey player.

Deaths
 14 February – Andreas Cervin, gymnast (born 1888).
 Aurora Nilsson (born 1894)
 28 November – Sibylla, princess of Sweden (born 1908)

References

 
Sweden
Years of the 20th century in Sweden